USS ATA-217 was an  of the United States Navy built near the end of World War II. Before completion, the name Tesota was cancelled and the ship was named ATA-217, an unnamed auxiliary ocean tug.

Career 
ATA-217 was laid down as the net tender Tesota (YN-95) on 11 December 1943 at Slidell, Louisiana, by the Canulette Shipbuilding Company; was reclassified a net laying ship and redesignated AN-71 on 20 January 1944; and was launched on 29 July 1944. However, the name Tesota was canceled on 10 August 1944, and the ship was reclassified an auxiliary ocean tug and re-designated ATA-217 on the same day. She was commissioned on 16 January 1945. Following a short shakedown cruise early in February 1945, the tug departed Norfolk, Virginia, for Hawaii and arrived at her home port, Pearl Harbor, on 1 March. After serving there for more than a year, the ship proceeded to the U.S. West Coast.

ATA-217 was decommissioned at Mare Island, California, on 7 May, and was struck from the Navy List on 21 May 1946. ATA-217 was transferred to the U.S. Maritime Commission on 25 March 1947 and was sold the same day to Martinolick Shipbuilding Co., San Francisco, California.

References 
 
 NavSource Online: Service Ship Photo Archive - YN-95 / AN-71 'Tesota'' - ATA-217

 

ATA-214-class tugs
Ships built in Slidell, Louisiana
1944 ships
World War II auxiliary ships of the United States